Kurt Sulzenbacher (born 29 October 1976) is an Italian former alpine skier who competed in the 2002 Winter Olympics and 2006 Winter Olympics.

Career
During his career he has achieved 2 results among the top 3 in the World Cup.

World Cup results
Top 3

National titles
Sulzenbacher has won one national championships at individual senior level.

Italian Alpine Ski Championships
Downhill: 2003

References

External links
 
 

1976 births
Living people
Italian male alpine skiers
Olympic alpine skiers of Italy
Alpine skiers at the 2002 Winter Olympics
Alpine skiers at the 2006 Winter Olympics
People from Innichen
Germanophone Italian people
Alpine skiers of Centro Sportivo Carabinieri
Sportspeople from Südtirol